Devotional – A Performance Filmed by Anton Corbijn is a video release by Depeche Mode, featuring almost an entire concert from their 1993 Devotional Tour, filmed in Barcelona, Spain (Palau Sant Jordi), Liévin, France (Stade Couvert Régional) and Frankfurt, Germany (Festhalle). It was directed by Anton Corbijn, and released in 1993. It was nominated for the Grammy Award for Best Long Form Music Video in 1995. The soundtrack was recorded in Liévin, Stade Couvert Régional, on 29 July 1993.

This tour was particularly notable for the personal troubles the band members were struggling with at the time, most notably Dave Gahan's heroin addiction. The video is the last release to feature Alan Wilder before his departure in 1995.

In 2004, the movie was re-released in DVD. The film is the same, but there are extras, such as songs that were left out of the VHS movie for time (but they have to be viewed separately), isolated footage of setlist projections, an interview with Corbijn on Devotional (1993), pictures from the Devotional Tour booklet, and all the music videos from the Songs of Faith and Devotion era.
For the first time, the complete soundtrack of Liévin is available (Halo was the only missing song before the release of the 2DVD set). Only a few dead airs and speeches were edited.

Track listing

VHS: BMG / 74321 17213-3 (UK)
 "Higher Love" Songs of Faith and Devotion (1993)
 "World in My Eyes" Violator (1990)
 "Walking in My Shoes" Songs of Faith and Devotion (1993)
 "Behind the Wheel" Music for the Masses (1987)
 "Stripped" Black Celebration (1986)
 "Condemnation" Songs of Faith and Devotion (1993)
 "Judas" Songs of Faith and Devotion (1993)
 "Mercy in You" Songs of Faith and Devotion (1993)
 "I Feel You" Songs of Faith and Devotion (1993)
 "Never Let Me Down Again" Music for the Masses (1987)
 "Rush" Songs of Faith and Devotion (1993)
 "In Your Room" Songs of Faith and Devotion (1993)
 "Personal Jesus" Violator (1990)
 "Enjoy the Silence" Violator (1990)
 "Fly on the Windscreen" Black Celebration (1986)
 "Everything Counts" Construction Time Again (1983)
 "Death's Door" (Acoustic) [no video footage, audio only and is played during the credits]

DVD: Mute Film / DMDVD4 (UK – 2004) 
Disc One
 Devotional: A Performance Filmed By Anton Corbijn (see above for songlist)
Bonus Tracks
 "Halo" Violator (1990)
 "Policy of Truth" Violator (1990)

Disc Two
 Tour Projections*Rather than use the eight screen Devotional Tour projections, it was easier to use the almost identical Exotic Tour projections which were all on one screen. The isolated video of the projections were played with audio of the song it was for.
 "Walking in My Shoes"
 "Stripped"
 "Condemnation"
 "Judas"
 "I Feel You"
 "Never Let Me Down Again" (The first half of the video was lost and unable to be recovered. The first half of the video featured a message from Corbijn, apologising and saying that the footage has "met its maker")
 "In Your Room"
 "Enjoy the Silence"
 Promotional music videos
 "I Feel You"
 "Walking in My Shoes"
 "Condemnation"
 "In Your Room"
 "One Caress"
 "Condemnation" (live) [Mixed in with the tour projection video]
 MTV Documentary – Depeche Mode Rockumentary 1993
 Monologue by Anton Corbijn – A short film by James Rose
 Devotional Tour (and Exotic Tour) programs

UMD: Mute Film / DMUMD4 (UK)
Devotional: A Performance Filmed By Anton Corbijn (see above for songlist)

All songs written by Martin Gore

Cast
Dave Gahan – lead vocals
Martin Gore – guitar, keyboards, lead and backing vocals
Alan Wilder – keyboards, piano, drums, percussion pads, backing vocals
Andy Fletcher – keyboards, backing vocals
 Hildia Campbell – backing vocals
 Samantha Smith – backing vocals

Charts

References

External links
 

1993 video albums
1993 live albums
Films directed by Anton Corbijn
Films shot in Barcelona
Films shot in France
Films shot in Germany
Depeche Mode video albums
Live video albums